Sebastian Masuda (増田 セバスチャン, Masuda Sebasuchan, born August 7, 1970), is a Japanese artist, art director, and producer of the Harajuku shop 6%DOKIDOKI. Born in Matsudo City, Chiba Prefecture. He has been active from 1995 to current day.

He has directed and designed performances for Kyary Pamyu Pamyu. He is known as a pioneer of kawaii culture and often referred to as the "king of kawaii" or "father of kawaii"

Career 
In 1995, Sebastian opened 6%DOKIDOKI in Ura-Harajuku. Celebrities have visited 6%DOKIDOKI, including Conan O'Brien, and clothing and accessories have been worn by BLACKPINK, and Nicki Minaj.

He was the art director for Kyary Pamyu Pamyu's Pon Pon Pon music video in 2011, which garnered international attention. He designed the Kawaii Monster Cafe in Harajuku, which had been a tourist destination, including visits from celebrities Kim Kardashian, singer Dua Lipa and Jenny of K-pop’s Blackpink. and "Miracle Gift Parade" to commemorate the 25th anniversary of the opening of Sanrio Puroland.

In 2014, he began his first solo exhibition Colorful Rebellion -Seventh nightmare- in New York.

In 2017, he was appointed as a Cultural Envoy by the Agency for Cultural Affairs and he has lived in the Netherlands while producing artwork, he has traveled to the African continent doing workshops and lectures. He is a visiting professor for Kyoto University of Art and Design and Yokohama College of Art and Design. He was also a visiting scholar at the Department of East Asian Studies at NYU

Solo exhibitions 

 2014「Colorful Rebellion –Seventh nightmare-」(Kianga Ellis Projects, New York February 28, 2014 – March 29, 2014) (Young At Art Museum, Miami July 12, 2014 – January 5, 2015) (Padiglione Visconti, Italy April 14, 2015 – April 19, 2015) (Terrada T-Art Gallery, Tokyo December 18 – 27, 2015) (Tropenmuseum , Amsterdam September 28, 2018 – September 1, 2019)
 2015「TRUE COLORS」（T-Art Gallery, Tokyo)
 2016 「TRUE COLORS」（Ronin Gallery, New York）
 2017 「Point-Rhythm World -Monet's Microcosm- “」（POLA Museum of Art）
 2017 「YOUR COLORS」（ROPPONGI HILLS A/D GALLERY）
 2019 「FOREVER COLORS」（ROPPONGI HILLS A/D GALLERY）

Group exhibitions 

 December 6 2014  Time After Time Capsule in Miami
 May 3 2015  Time After Time Capsule in NYC / Dag Hammarskjold Plaza
 November 13 2015 – May 2016  Time After Time Capsule NY Hello Kitty meets Seattle / EMP Museum
 April 13-16 2016  Time After Time Capsule in Washington, D.C. / Japan Bowl , National Cherry Blossom Festival
 July 3 2016  Time After Time Capsule in London / Camden Market North Yard
 July 7-10, 2016   Time After Time Capsule in Paris / Japan Expo
 July 23-24, 2016    Time After Time Capsule in San Francisco/J-POP SUMMIT
 November 26, 27, 2016  Time After Time Capsule in Singapore / Anime Festival Asia
 Nov 1, 2016 – Jan 29, 2017  Time After Time Capsule in Los Angeles / Japanese American National Museum
 May 14, 2017  Time After Time Capsule in NYC vol.2 / Japan Day at Central Park
 Oct. 13, 2017 – Ma 18, 2018  Time After Time Capsule in Alaska / ”The Art of Fandom” at Anchorage Museum
 November 26, 2017   Time After Time Capsule in Cape Town, South Africa / V&A Water Front
 November 30, 2017  Time After Time Capsule in Luanda , Republic of Angola / Angola National School of Arts
 January 13, 2018   Time After Time Capsule in La Paz , Bolivia / Cinemateca Boliviana
 January 20, 2018  Time After Time Capsule in Sao Paulo , Brazil / Japan House
 2017「The Doremon Exhibition TOKYO 2017」Mori Arts Center Gallery, Tokyo
 2019「Gaping Hole Secret」Reborn Art Festival 2019
 2020「Primal Pop (Pac-Man Mix)」The Museum of Pac-Man Art, Tokyo
 2020「Gaping Hole Secret」Kurkku Fields, Japan

References

External links 

 

Year of birth missing (living people)
Living people
Japanese art directors
Japanese pop artists
Harajuku
People from Matsudo